The following have served as masters of Magdalene College, Cambridge:

 1544–1546: Robert Evans
 1546–1559: Richard Carre
 1559–1576: Roger Kelke
 1576–1577: Richard Howland
 1577–1582: Degory Nicholls
 1582–1593: Thomas Nevile
 1593–1595: Richard Clayton
 1595–1604: John Palmer
 1604–1626: Barnaby Goche
 1626–1642: Henry Smyth
 1642–1650: Edward Rainbow
 1650–1660: John Sadler
 1660–1664: Edward Rainbow
 1664–1668: John Howorth
 1668–1679: James Duport
 1679–1690: John Peachell
 1690–1713: Gabriel Quadring
 1713–1740: Daniel Waterland
 1740–1746: Edward Abbott
 1746–1760: Thomas Chapman
 1760–1774: George Sandby
 1774–1781: Barton Wallop
 1781–1797: Peter Peckard
 1797–1813: William Gretton
 1813–1853: George Neville-Grenville
 1853–1904: Latimer Neville, 6th Baron Braybrooke
 1904–1915: Stuart Alexander Donaldson
 1915–1925: Arthur Christopher Benson
 1925–1947: Allen Beville Ramsay
 1947–1966: Sir Henry Willink
 1966–1978: Walter Hamilton
 1978–1985: Sir Derman Christopherson
 1985–1994: Sir David Calcutt
 1994–2002: Sir John Gurdon
 2002–2012: Duncan Robinson 
 2013–2020: Lord Williams of Oystermouth 
 2020–: Sir Christopher Greenwood

References

 
Magdalene